Maddahi is a ceremonial singing or eulogy recitation especially for Shia Muslims. The word Maddahi means "to praise" in Arabic. One who sings this style is called a maddah. Maddahs mostly sing on Ahl al-Bayt's birth and death anniversary. The theme of Maddahi may be joyous or sorrowful. Most maddahs are men but some women perform in exclusively female gatherings. The majority of maddahis are sung in mourning of Ahl al-Bayt, particularly at the Mourning of Muharram in the beginning of Muharram until the Day of Ashura and Arba'een.

See also
 Muharram
 Maddah
 Ashura
 Tasua

References 
 از پرده خوانی تا مرشدی jadidonline.com in Persian language

Arabic poetry
Shia literature
Mourning of Muharram
Persian poetry
Iranian music
Iraqi music
Iranian culture
Iraqi culture
Azerbaijani music